James Harrington Trafford (born 10 October 2002) is an English professional footballer who plays for Bolton Wanderers, on loan from Manchester City, as a goalkeeper.

Early life
Trafford grew up in Greysouthen in a farming family. He was a Chelsea fan. He attended Cockermouth School and St Bede's College.

Club career
Trafford began his career with Cockermouth and Carlisle United, signing with Manchester City in August 2015 at the age of 12. He moved on loan to Accrington Stanley in July 2021.

He signed on loan for Bolton Wanderers on 13 January 2022, until the end of the 2021–22 season. He kept four clean sheets in his first four games, the first time a new Bolton goalkeeper had done so in Bolton's entire history. On 15 June 2022, Trafford rejoined Bolton on loan for a further season. In July 2022, he signed a new five year contract with Manchester City. By October he was noted for his clean sheets, and Trafford broke Bolton's record for consecutive home clean sheets on 4 February, with the 1–0 win over Cheltenham Town being his eighth in a row. He was able to extend the record to 9, though was unable to have it reach double figures as on 25 February he conceded against Port Vale in a 2–1 win, the first time since 2 December.

International career
Trafford played his first international match of his career for England U17 on 24 March 2018 against Croatia U17 in which he saved a penalty and kept a clean sheet in a 0–0 draw despite England being down to ten men. He made a further six appearances for the U17 including one appearance at the 2019 UEFA European Under-17 Championship, then played twice for England U18, and once for England U19.

On 6 September 2021, Trafford made his debut for the England U20s during a 6–1 victory over Romania U20s at St. George's Park.

On 25 May 2022, Trafford received his first call up to the England U21 squad ahead of the final round of 2023 UEFA European Under-21 Championship qualification matches. Trafford made his debut in the 5–0 win away to Kosovo.

Playing style
He spent his early career as an outfield player.

Career statistics

References

2002 births
Living people
English footballers
Manchester City F.C. players
Accrington Stanley F.C. players
Bolton Wanderers F.C. players
English Football League players
Association football goalkeepers
England youth international footballers
Carlisle United F.C. players
England under-21 international footballers
Footballers educated at St Bede's College, Manchester